The Unión del Fútbol del Interior or UFI is an association affiliated to the Paraguayan Football Association that was founded in 1927 to organize and govern football outside of Asunción, specifically on each of the different Departments of Paraguay.

The UFI is constituted by the clubs and leagues that are part of the Departmental Football Federation from each Department in Paraguay. Club tournaments organized by the UFI gives chances to teams from all over Paraguay to reach the first division by clearing lower division levels. For a more detailed information about the Paraguayan football league system see the main article. The UFI is also in charge of the Campeonato Nacional de Interligas.

As of 2006 the UFI has 1,652 clubs affiliated, from which four of them are currently playing in the Paraguayan second division and three in the first division.

Federations
There are a total of 17 Federations linked to the UFI; one on each Department in Paraguay, with the purpose of organizing the different leagues and clubs affiliated to them.

Football in Paraguay